Sarif Sainui (born April 15, 1980) is a Thai retired professional footballer who played as a striker and current assistant manager of Thai League 1 club Bangkok United.

International career

Sarif played for the Thailand national team. He played 2 games and scored one goals

International goals

Honours

Club
Bangkok University
 Thailand Division 1 League (1): 2002-03

Buriram United
 Thai Premier League (1): 2011
 Thai FA Cup (2): 2011, 2012 
 Thai League Cup (2): 2011, 2012

External links
 
 

1980 births
Living people
Sarif Sainui
Sarif Sainui
Sarif Sainui
Sarif Sainui
Association football forwards
Sarif Sainui
Kelantan FA players
Sarif Sainui
Sarif Sainui
Sarif Sainui
Sarif Sainui
Sarif Sainui
Malaysia Super League players
Sarif Sainui
Thai expatriate footballers
Thai expatriate sportspeople in Malaysia
Expatriate footballers in Malaysia
Sarif Sainui